Statistics of Japanese Regional Leagues for the 1973 season.

Champions list

League standings

Kanto

Tokai

Kansai

Chūgoku

Kyushu

1973
Jap
Jap
3